is a passenger railway station located in the city of Hino, Tokyo, Japan, operated by the private railway company, Keio Corporation..

Lines 
Hirayamajōshi-kōen Station is served by the Keio Line, and is located 33.4 kilometers from the starting point of the line at Shinjuku Station.

Station layout 
This station consists of two opposed ground-level side platforms serving two tracks, connected by a footbridge.

Platforms

History
It was renamed to its present name on September 11, 1955. The station was relocated to its present location on October 23, 1976.

Passenger statistics
In fiscal 2019, the station was used by an average of 8,402 passengers daily. 

The passenger figures for previous years are as shown below.

Surrounding area
 Sueshige Shrine
 Hino City Hirayama Library
 Nanao Post Office

See also
 List of railway stations in Japan

References

External links

Keio Railway Station Information 

Keio Line
Stations of Keio Corporation
Railway stations in Tokyo
Railway stations in Japan opened in 1925
Hino, Tokyo